Vembanad is a 1990 Malayalam film, directed by Prof. Sivaprasad, starring K. P. A. C. Azeez, Mahesh and Jayabharathi in the lead roles. This experimental film without dialogues won Kerala State Film Award – Special Jury Award in 1990 and it was screened at the panorama section of 1991 Madras Film Festival. Film critic Kozhikodan included the film on his list of the 10 best Malayalam movies of all time.

Cast
 K. P. A. C. Azeez
 Jayabharathi
 Ranjini
 TN Gopinathan Nair	
 Babu Namboothiri	
  Kaveri
 Thesni Khan	
 Kuttyedathi Vilasini

References

External links

1991 films
1990s Malayalam-language films
Films directed by Kaviyoor Sivaprasad